is a Japanese scientist. He is the head of the  Systems Biology Institute (SBI); President and CEO of Sony Computer Science Laboratories; a Group Director of the Laboratory for Disease Systems Modeling at and RIKEN Center for Integrative Medical Sciences; and a professor at Okinawa Institute of Science and Technology (OIST). Kitano is known for developing AIBO, and the robotic world cup tournament known as Robocup.

Education
Kitano graduated from International Christian University with a B.A. in physics in 1984. He received a PhD in computer science from Kyoto University in 1991. His PhD thesis in machine translation was titled "Speech-to-speech translation: a massively parallel memory-based approach".  His work includes a broad spectrum of publications in artificial intelligence and interactomics.

Research
From 1988 to 1994, Kitano was a visiting researcher at the Center for Machine Translation at Carnegie Mellon University.

At Sony, Kitano started the development of the AIBO robotic pet. This research was developed further as the QRIO, a bipedal humanoid robot. The research behind AIBO and QRIO led to Kitano founding the RoboCup annual international robotics competition in 1997. The goal of RoboCup is to create a team of autonomous robotic footballers that would be able to beat the best team in the world, by 2050.

Kitano has made significant contributions to Systems biology, including a contribution to the Systems Biology Markup Language (SBML).

Roles and awards
Kitano has served as a scientific advisor for a number of companies, including Alstom, Segway Japan and Mitsubishi Chemical Holdings. He was awarded the IJCAI Computers and Thought Award in 1993 and the Nature Award for Creative Mentoring in Science in 2009.

References

External links
 ResearchMap profile
 Biological Robustness

1961 births
Living people
Systems biologists
Japanese bioinformaticians
International Christian University alumni
Kyoto University alumni
Carnegie Mellon University faculty